Zaragoza is a municipality in the Mexican state of Veracruz, located  southeast of the state capital of Xalapa and  southwest of the city of Minatitlán.

Geography
The municipality of Zaragoza is located on the coastal plain of southern Veracruz. It borders the municipalities of Cosoleacaque to the east and south, Jáltipan to the west, and Oteapan to the northwest.

Zaragoza's terrain is flat and is composed of pastureland (51%), farmland (36%) and built-up areas (14%). It is located in the Coatzacoalcos River basin.

Zaragoza's climate is humid with rain throughout the year.

History
It is conjectured that a group of Popoluca settlers from Oteapan founded a settlement in this location in the early 19th century, which was then called San Isidro Xumuapan. Zaragoza was incorporated on 1 December 1868 as a municipality in the canton of Minatitlán in the state of Veracruz. It became a free municipality on 15 January 1918.

Administration
The municipal government comprises a president, a councillor (Spanish: síndico), and a trustee (regidor). The current president of the municipality is Minerva Martínez Ramírez.

Demographics
In the 2010 Mexican Census, the municipality of Zaragoza recorded a population of 10,720 inhabitants living in 2393 households. The 2015 Intercensal Survey estimated a population of 11,354 inhabitants in Zaragoza, of whom 93.58% reported being of Indigenous ancestry and 11.45% reported being of African ancestry. In the 2010 Census, 3401 people or 32% of the population in Tepetzintla reported speaking an Indigenous language, of which 3341 spoke Nahuatl.

There are 18 localities in the municipality, of which only the municipal seat, also known as Zaragoza, is classified as urban. It recorded a population of 9639 inhabitants in the 2010 Census.

Economy
Many of Zaragoza's inhabitants work in nearby cities such as Minatitlán, Jáltipan or Cosoleacaque, either in the service industry or for Pemex-related companies. The farming of pigs and cattle also contributes to the local economy.

References

Municipalities of Veracruz
1868 establishments in Mexico
States and territories established in 1868